What We Did on Our Holiday is a 2014 British comedy-drama film written and directed by Andy Hamilton and Guy Jenkin. The film, starring David Tennant, Rosamund Pike, and Billy Connolly, was inspired by, but not related to, the BBC show Outnumbered.

Plot
Doug McLeod (David Tennant) and his wife Abi (Rosamund Pike) unite following a tense separation to travel to the Scottish Highlands for Doug's father Gordie's (Billy Connolly) 75th birthday. Gordie has terminal cancer so Doug's brother, millionaire Gavin McLeod (Ben Miller) has arranged a lavish party for him, inviting all the important people in the neighbourhood. Despite difficulties getting their three children, Lottie (Emilia Jones), Mickey (Bobby Smalldridge), and Jess (Harriet Turnbull), to leave the house, they hit the road, but find it congested and they are forced to stop overnight.

Lottie expresses her troubles with trusting her parents following their recent separation and lies to each other; it is revealed that Doug had an affair, which led to Abi moving out and taking legal proceedings against him. They are only travelling to the Highlands together to appear as a couple for Gordie, not wanting to upset him in his final months.

On arriving at Gavin's mansion, a tense rivalry becomes apparent between Doug and Gavin. Gordie, despite being extremely ill, is fun-loving and encourages his grandchildren, particularly Lottie, to let go of their troubles and enjoy life. While Gavin, Doug, Abi and Gavin's wife Margaret (Amelia Bullmore) make the final arrangements for the party, Gordie takes the three children to the beach. He reveals that he is descended from Vikings, a fact that Mickey in particular is excited about; he reveals his desire to be buried "the Viking way" by being cremated and sent out to sea. He believes this will stop arguments between Doug and Gavin. Later, while Lottie, Mickey and Jess are playing, Gordie dies peacefully.

Lottie returns to the house to tell the adults, leaving her siblings with Gordie's body. However, when she arrives she sees them all arguing, Abi telling Doug she is seeing someone else and will be moving the children to Newcastle, and Gavin with his family over what Gordie wants for his birthday, Lottie returns to the beach without telling them. Fulfilling Gordie's last wish, the three children create an improvised raft and using petrol from Gordie's pickup, send him out to sea aflame, "Viking" style.
 
The children return home and tell the adults what has happened. The adults are horrified, and Doug and Gavin head to the beach, where they find Gordie's pick-up truck partially submerged by the high tide; Gavin breaks down in Doug's arms. Abi and Margaret break the news of Gordie's death to the party guests, and word quickly gets out about what the children did. The police arrive to investigate, accompanied by social services worker Agnes Chisholm (Celia Imrie), who interviews the children about their actions, and after speaking with Lottie she contemplates removing them from Doug and Abi's care. The press descends on the house, with Lottie, Jess and Mickey's actions making headlines worldwide.

While using Gavin and Margaret's son Kenneth's (Lewis Davie) computer, Mickey and Jess accidentally stumble upon a video of Gavin's wife Margaret attacking a fellow shopper at a supermarket as a result of depression. Gavin also sees it, having been previously unaware of his wife's issues. After the press paints the children's actions as depraved, Doug and Abi make a statement to the press that what their children did was not malicious, and that they support the children's efforts to honour their grandfather, however misguided it may seem; seeing the support the children receive, Chisholm ends her investigation, leaving the children with their parents.

In the final scene, Gavin and Doug hold a memorial for Gordie at the beach, where the brothers are shown to have buried the hatchet. Abi tells Doug she will not be moving to Newcastle, and the couple decides to divorce civilly, apologising to their children. The film ends with the extended family honouring Gordie on a hill above the beach with some friends, and then the family playfully splashing around at the water's edge on the beach.

Cast

 David Tennant as Doug McLeod
 Rosamund Pike as Abi McLeod
 Billy Connolly as Gordie McLeod
 Celia Imrie as Agnes Chisholm
 Ben Miller as Gavin McLeod
 Emilia Jones as Lottie McLeod
 Amelia Bullmore as Margaret McLeod
 Annette Crosbie as Doreen
 Lewis Davie as Kenneth McLeod
 Ralph Riach as Jimmy Cazzarotto
 Ben Presley as PC McLuhan
 Bobby Smalldridge as Mickey McLeod
 Alexia Barlier as Françoise Dupré
 Ryan Hunter as Frazer
 Harriet Turnbull as Jess Mcleod
 Jake D'Arcy as Smokey

Production
The film was shot on location in Glasgow and the Scottish Highlands between 27 June and 2 August 2013. The beach scenes were filmed at Gairloch. The family home of Gavin McLeod is in Drymen near Loch Lomond.  The ostriches farmed by Gordie's friend Doreen are actually located at Blair Drummond Safari Park.

Release
What We Did on Our Holiday was released in the United Kingdom on 26 September 2014 and in the United States as What We Did on Our Vacation on 10 July 2015.

Box office
The film earned $6,390,566 in the United Kingdom and $1,976,185 in Australia, New Zealand, and the United Arab Emirates, totalling $8,366,751 worldwide.

Critical reception
The film received positive reviews from critics. Review aggregator website Rotten Tomatoes reports a 73% rating based on 41 reviews with an average rating of 6.2/10. The site's consensus states: "Witty and well-cast, What We Did on Our Holiday injects unlikely laughs into a story dealing with dark, difficult themes." On Metacritic, the film has a 54 out of 100 rating, based on 14 critics.

References

External links
 
 
 
 
 

2014 films
2014 comedy-drama films
British comedy-drama films
Films about cancer in the United Kingdom
Films about death
Films about dysfunctional families
Films about vacationing
Films scored by Alex Heffes
Films set in Scotland
Films shot in Glasgow
Films shot in Scotland
BBC Film films
Lionsgate films
Films directed by Guy Jenkin
2010s English-language films
2010s British films